Puck de Leeuw (1953 - 8 February 2002) was a Dutch director.

She gained most fame with her series Love beyond frontiers, describing European women who have fallen in love with men from completely different cultural backgrounds and decided go to their homes. The first documentary of the series brought her the 'Golden Zapper', the Audience Award for best documentary at the 1996 International Documentary Filmfestival Amsterdam.
De Leeuw died of lung cancer at the age of 48 in 2002 before she could finish the third entry, Made in America.  Een jaar of minder is a 2006 documentary film about her by director Jac Vleeshouwers.

Documentary films
 Het gebeurde in de polder (It happened in the polder) (1985)
 Love beyond frontiers (Grenzeloze liefde) – Made in Japan (1996)
 Love beyond frontiers (Grenzeloze liefde) – Made in Africa (1999)

External links
  Love beyond frontiers - Made in Japan
  Love beyond frontiers - Made in Africa

References

1953 births
2002 deaths
Dutch documentary filmmakers
Dutch women film directors
Deaths from cancer in the Netherlands
Women documentary filmmakers
Deaths from lung cancer